Sai is a patronymic surname of Ga origin. The bearers of the name typically hail from Osu, Accra in Ghana. Notable people with the surname include: 

Florence Oboshie Sai-Coffie (born 1953), Ghanaian media executive and politician
Fred T. Sai  (1924 – 2019), Ghanaian physician and family planning advocate
Obodai Sai (born 1984), Ghanaian boxer 

Ga-Adangbe families
Ga-Adangbe people
Ghanaian families
Ghanaian surnames
Patronymic surnames
Sai family